Yiğit Caner Aydın (born 23 August 1992) is a Turkish world-champion para-archer competing in the Men's compound bow W1 event.

Early life
Yiğit Caner Aydın was born in Trabzon, northeastern Turkey on 23 August 1992. He moved to Istanbul with his family at the age of three.

In 2006, he started to develop web projects, and earning his living. In 2010, he entered Faculty of Astronomy and Space Science at Istanbul University. By participating in social responsibility projects, he aimed to help children living in disadvantaged regions develop their social skills and themselves.

In 2013, as he was sitting in a lounge at his friend's school, a heavy stand fell over his head, and fractured his neck at C6 level. He was eight months in the hospital following six days of intensive care stay. He became paralyzed from the chest down. He underwent physical therapy for two and half years, at the end of which he was finally able to use wheelchair.

Sports career
In 2016, Aydın started para archery after he met Naci Yenier, a para archer, through his father. He took part in trainings at Archery Foundation. With the money he saved before the accident, he bought archery equipment. Supported by his parents, he was training 5–6 hours a day.

He was selected to the national team. Points he collected at international competitions enabled him to participate at the World Archery Championships in 2017. He and his two teammates took the gold medal in the Men W1 Open Team event at the 2017 World Para Archery Championships in Beijing, China. He was part of team setting a World record in the 50m event with 1,967 points. He won the gold medal in the Men W1 Open event and another gold medal in the Men W1 Open Team event with two teammates at the First Leg of the 2019 Para Archery European Cup held in Olbia, Sardinia, Italy. The Turkish team set a World record with 215 points. At the 2019 World Para Archery Championships in s-Hertogenbosch, Netherlands, he won the gold medal in the Men W1 Open Team, and repeated the World Team record . He became champion in the Men W1 event at the Para-Archery World Ranking Tournament and Final Paralympic Qualification 2021 held in Nové Město nad Metují,  Czech Republic. He won two gold medals at the 2022 World Para Archery Championships held in Dubai, United Arab Emirates, one in the Men W1 event and another in the Men W1 Doubles event together with his teammate Nihat Türkmenoğlu. He won silver medal in the Men W1 and gold medal in the Men W1 Doubles event at Para-Archery European Championships at the 2022 Rome. One week after this competition, he became champion in the Men W1 event at the 2021 Konya.

Aydın ranks world second in the world ranking currently.

See also 

 Curtis Mayfield, who was paralyzed after a similar accident

References

1992 births
Living people
Sportspeople from Trabzon
Istanbul University alumni
Turkish male archers
Paralympic archers of Turkey
Wheelchair category Paralympic competitors
Islamic Solidarity Games medalists in archery
21st-century Turkish people